The montane water vole (Arvicola scherman) is a species of vole found throughout Europe, from the mountains of northern Spain through central Europe and eastwards through to central Romania. Initially regarded as a species, it was reassigned as a subspecies of terrestris before being again designated as a species by Panteleyev in 2000.

References

Sources

Wilson and Reeder. Mammal Species of the World (3rd edition)

Arvicola
Mammals described in 1801